Raphael Onyedika Nwadike  (born 19 April 2001) is a Nigerian professional footballer who plays as a midfielder for Belgian club Club Brugge.

Career

Midtjylland
Onyedika used to play street football before joining F.C. Ebedei's academy at the age of 15. After three years in Ebedei, Onyedika joined the academy of FC Midtjylland in Denmark, an affiliate club to FC Ebedei, shortly after his 18th birthday.

In his first full season in FC Midtjylland, he impressed in the U19 League and in the UEFA Youth League with his physique, speed and cash playing style. So much, that he on 1 July 2020 signed his first five-year professional contract with the club until June 2025. To gain some more experience, Onyedika was loaned out to Midtjylland's affiliate club, Danish 1st Division-side FC Fredericia, on 19 August 2020 for the whole 2020–21 season. Onyedika did well on his loan spell, playing 28 games and scoring three goals. The season went so well that the Nigerian came on TV3 Sport's team of the year in the Danish 1st Division.

Onyedika returned to Midtjylland in the summer 2021 and was promoted to the first team squad. He got his official debut for Midtjylland on 16 July 2021 against Odense Boldklub, the first game of the 2021–22 Danish Superliga, where he was in the starting line-up and played the whole game.

Club Brugge
On 28 August 2022, Onyedika signed a five-year contract with Club Brugge in Belgium.

References

External links

Living people
2001 births
Sportspeople from Imo State
Nigerian footballers
Nigeria international footballers
Association football midfielders
Danish Superliga players
Danish 1st Division players
F.C. Ebedei players
FC Midtjylland players
FC Fredericia players
Club Brugge KV players
Nigerian expatriate footballers
Nigerian expatriate sportspeople in Denmark
Expatriate men's footballers in Denmark
Nigerian expatriate sportspeople in Belgium
Expatriate footballers in Belgium